Steen Erik Mastrup (born 2 June 1958) is a Danish former motorcycle speedway rider.

Born in Naestved, Mastrup established himself in Danish speedway and represented Denmark at under-21 level in 1977. He made his British League debut in 1978 with Swindon Robins. By 1981 his average had risen to above six points per match. He was capped several times in the full Denmark team. After an injury in 1982 he suffered a drop in form in 1983 and transferred to Leicester Lions. This was his final season in British speedway. (His form improved at Leicester later that year and he positively announced at the end of year meeting he would be back next season but the sudden closure of the Leicester track that winter probably resulted in his non-return to British speedway.

References

1958 births
Living people
Danish speedway riders
Swindon Robins riders
Leicester Lions riders
People from Næstved Municipality
Sportspeople from Region Zealand